Mene majka gleda sa čardaka (Mother Watches Me From the Pergola) is the 26th release and first studio album by Bosnian sevdalinka and folk singer Beba Selimović, following nearly two decades of only releasing singles and extended plays. It was released 23 September 1971 through the label Jugoton.

Track listing

Personnel

Crew
Mario Lozić – design
Marko Čolić – design

References

1971 albums
Beba Selimović albums
Jugoton albums